Charlotte Jakobsen (born 12 May 1981) is a Danish sports shooter. She competed in the 300 meter rifle prone and 300 meter rifle three positions events at multiple World and European Championships.

 she is the world record co-holder in the 300 meter rifle prone ISSF event.

References

External links
 

Living people

1981 births
Danish female sport shooters
European Games competitors for Denmark
People from Horsens Municipality

Sportspeople from the Central Denmark Region
21st-century Danish women